Pelosia noctis is a moth of the subfamily Arctiinae. It was described by Arthur Gardiner Butler in 1881. It is found in the Russian Far East (Middle Amur, Primorye, Sakhalin, Kunashir), Korea, China (Liaonin, Jiangsu, Shaanxi) and Japan.

References

Lithosiina
Moths described in 1881